State Route 878 (SR 878) is a short state highway in Washoe County, Nevada. The highway is known as Slide Mountain Road.

Route description

The southern terminus of SR 878 is at the eastern base of Slide Mountain, in the mountains of the Carson Range near Lake Tahoe, at the parking lot for the Winters Creek Lodge of the Mount Rose Ski Resort. From this point, one can see Washoe Valley and Washoe Lake in the distance.

History
Slide Mountain Road was first approved for the SR 878 designation on July 1, 1976.

Major intersections

See also

References

878
Transportation in Washoe County, Nevada